The name Luis de Velasco can refer to:
 Don Luis (active 1561–1571), a Native American also known as Paquiquino (named for the following at baptism)
 Luís de Velasco (1511–1564), second viceroy of New Spain 
 Luis de Velasco, 1st Marquess of Salinas (c.1534–1617), son of the previous
 Luis de Velasco y Velasco, 2nd Count of Salazar (1559–1625), son of the previous
 Luis Vicente de Velasco (1711–1762), naval commander
 Luis de Velasco Rami (born 1939), Spanish economist